Benjamin Michael Zuckerman (born August 16, 1943) is an astrophysicist and an emeritus professor in the Department of Physics & Astronomy at UCLA. His recent work focus primarily on formation and evolution of planetary systems around various types of stars.

Education 
Zuckerman completed two degrees in 1963, one in Physics and one in Aeronautic & Astronautics at Massachusetts Institute of Technology. He finished his PhD thesis in Astronomy in 1968 at Harvard University.

Scientific publications 
Since 1965, Zuckerman has published well over 200 refereed papers in journals such as Astrophysical Journal, Nature, Astronomy & Astrophysics and Science, of which he was first author for close to 100. He also produced a number of review papers in Annual review of astronomy and astrophysics. In 2001, he participated in the Encyclopedia of Astronomy and Astrophysics.

Zuckerman was co-author of a 2008 paper reporting first directly-imaged multiplanetary system (arguably, the first directly imaged planets) around HR 8799 and a 2010 paper discovering a fourth imaged planet in the system: HR 8799 e.

Outreach work 
In 1982, Zuckerman co-edited a book called Extraterrestrials, Where Are They with Michael Hart. The book was republished in 1995. He also co-authored the book The Origin and Evolution of the Universe with Matthew A. Malkan. In 1996, he also wrote with David Jefferson the book Human Population and the Environmental Crisis, following a public symposium of the same name held at UCLA in October 1993.

References

External links 
 Benjamin Zuckerman webpage on UCLA Department of Physics and Astronomy website
 Benjamin Zuckerman’s Astronomy Web Page
 Benjamin Zuckerman's page on NASA Astrobiology Institute website
 Benjamin Zuckerman publication list on NASA ADS

Living people
MIT Department of Physics alumni
Harvard Graduate School of Arts and Sciences alumni
American astrophysicists
University of California, Los Angeles faculty
1943 births
MIT School of Engineering alumni